Dany Laferrière  (born Windsor Kléber Laferrière, 13 April 1953) is a Haitian-Canadian novelist and journalist who writes in French. He was elected to seat 2 of the Académie française on 12 December 2013, and inducted in May 2015.

Life
Born in Port-au-Prince, Haiti, and raised in Petit-Goâve, Laferrière worked as a journalist in Haiti before moving to Canada in 1976. He also worked as a journalist in Canada, and hosted television programming for the TQS network.

Laferrière published his first novel, How to Make Love to a Negro Without Getting Tired (Comment faire l'amour avec un nègre sans se fatiguer) in 1985. The novel was later adapted into a screenplay by Laferrière and Richard Sadler, earning a Genie Award nomination for best adapted screenplay at the 11th Genie Awards in 1990. The film adaptation of the novel starred Isaach De Bankolé and was directed by Jacques W. Benoit.

Laferrière writes exclusively in French, although some of his works have been published in English translation by David Homel.

Several further films have been adapted from his work, including On the Verge of a Fever (Le Goût des jeunes filles) in 2004 and Heading South (Vers le sud) in 2005. He also wrote the original screenplays for Voodoo Taxi in 1991 and How to Conquer America in One Night (Comment conquérir l'Amérique en une nuit) in 2004, and was the director of the latter.

In 2009, Laferrière won the prestigious Prix Médicis for his 11th novel, L'énigme du retour. Upon receiving the prize, he commented on its ability to open up a new readership in France, giving him visibility there. In the past Laferrière had always refused to be published in the fall, a season associated with the great literary prizes, but had been recommended to do so with L'énigme du retour by his editors. The novel follows Laferrière as he returns to his birthplace in Haiti, 33 years after he left it, upon learning of his father's death in New York City. The narrative blurs the line between prose and poetry, resembling haiku structures in some sections.

On 12 December 2013, Laferrière was elected on the first round of balloting to Seat no. 2 of the Académie française, becoming the first Haitian, the first Canadian and the first Quebecer to receive that honour. He is the second black person to have been inducted, the first being Senegalese writer and statesman Léopold Sédar Senghor in 1983.

On 3 June 2014, he was awarded the International Literature Award by the House of World Cultures for his novel The Return (L'enigme du retour).

In 2014, he was appointed officer of the National Order of Quebec. In 2015, Laferrière was awarded the Order of Canada with the grade of officer.

In 2016,  Laferrière won the Martin Luther King Jr. Achievement Award for his literary achievements.

Laferrière lives in Miami, Florida.

Works

 Comment faire l'amour avec un nègre sans se fatiguer, 1985 (Éditions VLB)
 English translation How to Make Love to a Negro Without Getting Tired, 1987 (Coach House Press)
 Éroshima, 1987 (Éditions VLB)
 English translation Eroshima, 1991 (Coach House Press)
 L'odeur du café, 1991 (Éditions VLB)
 English translation An Aroma of Coffee, 1993 (Coach House Press)
 Le goût des jeunes filles, 1992 (Éditions VLB)
 English translation Dining with the Dictator, 1994 (Coach House Press)
 Cette grenade dans la main du jeune nègre est-elle une arme ou un fruit?, 1993 (Éditions VLB), Prix RFO du livre (2002)
 English translation Why Must a Black Writer Write About Sex?, 1994 (Coach House Press)
 Chronique de la dérive douce 1994 (Éditions VLB, poetry)
 English translation A Drifting Year, 1997 (Douglas & McIntyre)
 Pays sans chapeau, 1996 (Éditions Lanctôt)
 English translation Down Among the Dead Men, 1997 (Douglas & McIntyre)
 La chair du maître, 1997 (Éditions Lanctôt)
 Le charme des après-midi sans fin, 1997 (Éditions Lanctôt)
 Le cri des oiseaux fous, 2000 (Serpent à plumes)
 J'écris comme je vis ; Entretien avec Bernard Magnier, 2000 (Éditions La passe du vent)
 Je suis fatigué, 2000 (Les librairies initiales)
 Je suis fou de Vava, 2005 (Éditions de la Bagnole)
Pays sans chapeau, 2006 (Éditions du Boréal)
Vers le Sud, 2006 (Grasset) 
English translation Heading South, 2008 (Douglas & McIntyre)
 Je suis un écrivain japonais
 English translation I Am a Japanese Writer, 2010 (Douglas & McIntyre)
 La fête des morts, 2009 (Éditions de la Bagnole)
 L'énigme du retour, 2009 (Québec: Boréal, France: Grasset)
 English translation The Enigma of the Return, 2011 (Douglas & McIntyre)
 Tout bouge autour de moi, 2010 (Mémoire d'encrier)
 English translation "The World is Moving Around Me", 2013 (Arsenal Pulp Press)
 L'Art presque perdu de ne rien faire, 2011 (Boréal)
 Journal d'un écrivain en pyjama, 2013 (Montréal: Mémoire d'encrier)
 Tout ce qu'on ne te dira pas, Mongo, 2015 (Montréal: Mémoire d'encrier)

Further reading
Beniamin Vasile, Dany Laferrière: l'autodidacte et le processus de création, Paris: l'Harmattan, collection "Critiques Littéraires", 2008

References

External links

1953 births
Black Canadian filmmakers
Black Canadian writers
Canadian male novelists
20th-century Canadian poets
21st-century Canadian poets
Canadian poets in French
Film directors from Montreal
Haitian Quebecers
Governor General's Award-winning children's writers
Haitian emigrants to Canada
Haitian male novelists
Writers from Montreal
People from Port-au-Prince
Prix Médicis winners
Members of the Académie Française
Living people
Canadian novelists in French
Canadian male poets
Officers of the National Order of Quebec
Officers of the Order of Canada
20th-century Haitian novelists
20th-century Haitian poets
21st-century Haitian novelists
21st-century Haitian poets
20th-century Canadian novelists
21st-century Canadian novelists
20th-century Canadian male writers
21st-century Canadian male writers
20th-century Canadian screenwriters
21st-century Canadian screenwriters
Canadian screenwriters in French
Canadian children's writers in French